This is a list of postage stamps that are especially notable in some way, often due to antiquity or a postage stamp error. Among the best-known stamps are:
 Penny Black (Great Britain)
 Treskilling Yellow (Sweden)
 Bull's Eye (Brazil)
 British Guiana 1c magenta
 Mauritius "Post Office"
 Inverted Jenny (United States)
 Basel Dove (Switzerland)

Current political entities

Austria
 Red Mercury – newspaper stamp

Belgium
 Leopold with the Epaulettes (1849)
 Inverted Dendermonde (1920)

Bermuda
 Perot provisional

Brazil
 Bull's Eye
 Goat's Eye

Canada
 Canada 12d black
 Canada 2c Large Queen on laid paper – Rarest Canadian stamp
 Bluenose
 St. Lawrence Seaway invert
Canada Scott 10 – 6d Deep Reddish Purple Pence 1857
Canada Scott 13 – 6d Perforated Pence 1859
Canada Scott 40e – Ten Cent Small Queen Pale Milky Rose Lilac First Montreal Printing 1874

China
 Red Revenues – 1897 provisionals, issued by the Qing dynasty
 Big Dragon stamp – the first official Chinese stamps, issued by the Qing dynasty
 The Whole Country is Red – 1968 design error stamp
 Golden Monkey stamp – 1980 Chinese zodiac stamp

Hong Kong
 Hong Kong Jubilee 1891 – First overprinted commemorative stamp in the world (Commons Image)
 George VI - Queen Elizabeth Silver Jubilee 1948

Finland
 Finland Zeppelin "1830"
 Finland 20k black stamped envelope – Most valuable postal stationery

France
 Ceres – France's first stamp
 One franc vermilion
 Black twenty centimes

Germany
 Baden 9 Kreuzer error – stamp printed on blue-green instead of pink paper
 One kreuzer black – issued 1849 in Bavaria, first German postage stamp
 Sachsen 3 Pfennige red – Saxony was the second German state to issue postage stamps
 Saxony 1/2g on light blue paper error
 Vineta provisional – an unauthorized issue
 Yacht issue – a common design of postage stamps for the German colonies

Greece
 "Solferino" – Large Hermes head of 40 lepta, lilac-rose on greenish paper (1871) – image

Honduras
  – Black airmail overprint (two currently known)

India
 Scinde Dawk – First stamps in Asia
 Inverted Head Four Annas
 Indian 10 Rupee Mahatma Gandhi postage stamp – Mahatma Gandhi 10 rupees stamp overprinted "SERVICE"
 Duttia – 2 annas with red seal (1894?), a possibly unique Indian Feudatory State stamp

Ireland
 1935 Irish 2d coil stamp

Italy
 Tuscany 3-lira ocher
 Tuscany 4-crazie Lion inverted tablet – Unique error
 Italy General Balbo triptych
 Gronchi Rosa

Jamaica
 Jamaica 1 shilling inverted-frame stamp error
 Jamaica 6d abolition of slavery postage stamp
 Jamaica 1956-58 £1 chocolate and violet
 Jamaica 1968 human rights stamps

Japan
 Japan 500m Dragon invert

Libya
 "Khadafi" 1986 – Ordinary set of 12 stamps; error in design resulted in its withdraw from circulation hours after being issued on 1 January 1986
 "Khadafi Prize" 1994 – Minisheet of 16 stamps; errors in design resulted in them not being released and instead substituted with a correct mini sheet on 31 December 1994

Malta
 Halfpenny Yellow (1860–84) – Malta's first stamp
 Saint Paul 10s black (1919) – one of Malta's rarest stamps
 Melita issue (1922–26) – stamp issue commemorating Malta's self-government

Mauritius
 Mauritius "Post Office" stamps

The Netherlands

 Wilhelmina 5 cent orange (1891) – Creation of Carl Gietzelt, an employee of Joh. Enschedé; mentioned in NVPH as 35f.; 24 are known to exist, 10 are used of which 3 on cover
 7½ cent dark violet, syncopated type D (1927) – Three-hole, four-sided interrupted perforation

New Zealand

 1906 Christchurch Exhibition 1d Claret Colour – Miscoloured
 1996 Teddy Bear Health Stamp – Withdrawn because it showed an incorrect use of a car child restraint, though a number were still sold
 Maori Performing Arts stamps – Sets of five stamps printed but destroyed before release, after causing public offense (with a very small number sold by mistake)
 1904 Pictorial 4d Lake Taupo invert – Only one copy known

Romania
 Moldavian Bull's Heads – Issued by the principality of Moldavia in 1858

Russia

Russian Empire 
  (Tiflis unique) (1857) – One of the rarest Russian stamps, issued in Tiflis, Georgia; only three specimens known
 First stamp of the Russian Empire (1857)
  (1908) – A very rare Russian stamp; 15–20 specimens may exist

RSFSR 
  (1922) – A rare 50-kopeck Russian consular tax stamp with Air Post and 1,200m overprint; estimated 50–75 specimens in existence; overprint type IV occurs only twice per setting of 25, hence only four can exist
 R.S.F.S.R. Definitives tête-bêche block (1922) – 7,500-ruble blue, horizontal watermark, gutter tête-bêche block of four; possibly unique
 70r Red Army Soldier error (1922) – 70-ruble perforated 12.5 or imperforate orange red error; position 72 in part of the issue; 4 imperforate specimens known

Soviet Union 

 Soviet Air Post "Wide 5" surcharged (1924) – A surcharge of 10 kopecks on 5-ruble green type II, basic stamp wide "5", complete pane of 25; unique
  (1925) – 15-kopeck yellow, "Peasant", Gold Standard issue, if in mint condition
  (1931) – A very rare Soviet stamp, especially if imperforate; 24 imperforate specimens known
  (1932) – "All-Soviet Philatelic Exhibition" in Moscow, souvenir sheet of four on thick card, with three line overprint "To the best shock worker of the All Russian Philatelic Society – President of the Moscow Philatelic Organization E.M. Nurk"; 25 were issued
  (1935) – San Francisco inverted surcharge with small Cyrillic "f"; possibly unique (see also Overprint#Commemorative overprints)
  (1964) – Plate error (asymmetric star) of the first Soviet numbered Tokyo Olympic souvenir sheet

South Africa

 Cape 4d black Triangle
 Cape 4d red error of color

Sweden
 Treskilling Yellow – Unique error, world's record auction sales price for a postage stamp

Switzerland
 Basel Dove
 Double Geneva
 Zurich 4 and 6

Trinidad
 Lady McLeod private local post

Uganda
 Uganda Cowries – The first stamps of Uganda, typewritten

United Kingdom

 Penny Black – World's first postage stamp
 Penny Blue – Trial printings from a penny black plate
 Two pence blue – Issued for second rate step, at the same time as Penny Black
 VR official – First official stamp
 Prince Consort Essay 
 Penny Red – Improved follow-ons to the Penny Black
 Archer Roulette – Experimental separation of stamps
 Edward VII 2d Tyrian plum – Withdrawn before issue, but one used
 Postal Union Congress £1 stamp

Falkland Islands
 HMS Glasgow error

Gibraltar
 Gibraltar 10c missing-value error

United States

 St. Louis Bears
 Alexandria "Blue Boy" Postmaster's Provisional – Unique, entire
 New York Postmaster's Provisional
 1c Z grill – Rarest US stamp
 Black Bull – Dollar value of the 1898 Trans-Mississippi Issue
 Pan-American invert
 Inverted Jenny – The "upside-down airplane"
 Dag Hammarskjöld invert – Error deliberately mass-produced
 CIA invert – Modern error
 Statue of Liberty Forever stamp (2011) – Largest run of an error on a US postage stamp (10.5 billion)
 Lost Continental – 1875 24c Winfield Scott
Pagsanjan Falls stamp – A postage stamp issued on 3 May 1932, noted for its printing error

Uruguay
 1856, 80c. green, Ferrer block of 15 – Unique
 1858, 120c. blue, tête-bêche vertical pair – Unique
 1858, 180c Sol de Mayo red error of color – Unique
 1858, 180c. green, in mixed franking with 1860 thick figures 60 c. brown lilac – Unique on cover

Former political entities

British Guiana
 British Guiana 1c magenta

Ceylon
 Dull Rose – A 4 pence denomination issued on 23 April 1859, considered the most valuable stamp of Ceylon

Confederate States of America
CSA #10 – Rarest Confederate stamp

Kingdom of Hawaii
 Hawaiian Missionaries – First stamps of Hawaii

State of Buenos Aires
 Buenos Aires 1859 1p "In Ps" tete-beche pair

Western Australia (British colony)
 Black Swan
 Inverted Swan

See also

References

External links
 Stamp Magazine online World's rarest stamps (archived 9 August 2010)